The 9M120 Ataka (Attack) is an anti-tank guided missile (ATGM) originating from the Soviet Union. The NATO reporting name of the 9M120 missile is the AT-9 Spiral-2. It is the next major generation in the 9K114 Shturm (AT-6 Spiral) family. The missile has radio command guidance and is also a beam riding SACLOS. This missile's primary variant was designed to defeat tanks with composite armour and explosive reactive armor. The 9M120 Ataka system is often confused with the 9K121 Vikhr system, despite being different weapons systems developed by different companies. The former was designed by the KBM machine-building design bureau and manufactured by the Degtyarev plant. According to the Stockholm International Peace Research Institute, Russia exported the Ataka ATGM to Iran, Kazakhstan, and Slovenia.

Development
The 9M120 missile was developed by the Kolomna engineering design bureau, located in Kolomna. This company already designed previous ATGMs, such as the 9M14 Malyutka and 9M114 Kokon missiles. The design work began in the mid 1980s. The Ataka ATGM was designed as a successor model to and a further development of the 9K114 Shturm, which was introduced in the late 1970s. Compared to its predecessor, the AT-9 is more resistant to electronic countermeasures, and has a greater hit accuracy and longer reach. The newly developed warhead allows for increased penetration power and effectiveness against explosive reactive armor. The first units were delivered in 1985 to the Soviet armed forces.

The missile has often been confused in the West with the 9A4172 Vikhr dual-purpose laser beam riding missile used on the Kamov helicopters and Sukhoi attack aircraft (as well as some Ukrainian Mi-24/35 upgrades). These systems are completely unrelated in their design and are in fierce competition. New light multifunctional guided missiles with increased range – up to 25 kilometers – have been developed and received for Russian attack helicopters on the outcomes of the military operation in Syria.

Description

The Ataka missile is stored in a glass reinforced plastic tube, which also acts as its launcher. The missile is reported to be considerably faster than the 9K114 Shturm, with longer range than the original version. It still uses radio command guidance, but the system has been improved when compared to the earlier 9K114 Shturm.

The system is carried by the multiple kinds of helicopters including the Mi-28 and Mi-35. It is also offered for ground vehicles like the BMPT and the 9P149.

There are three main missiles that are compatible with the launch system. The first is a two-stage anti-armour weapon that features a tandem warhead for dealing with add-on armor. The second variant of the missile – designated as 9M120F – has a thermobaric warhead for use against infantry positions and bunkers. The third variant of the 9M120 Ataka is the 9M220, which features a proximity fused expanding rod warhead, providing the missile with Surface-to-Air capability against low- and slow-flying aircraft.

Variants

9M120 Ataka "AT-9 Spiral-2" SACLOS radio command guidance missile.
9M120 – This variant features a tandem HEAT warhead to defeat current and future armored fighting vehicles equipped with ERA.
9M120F – This variant uses a thermobaric warhead for greater effect against buildings, unarmored targets, and bunkers.
9M220O – This variant is included with an expanding rod warhead for use against helicopters. It is equipped with a proximity fuse to destroy aircraft, and detonates its fragmentation warhead when less than four meters from the target.
9M120M – A modernized variant with an extended range of 8,000 m. The improved warhead can penetrate over 950 mm of RHA after ERA.
9M120D – An improved variant with a range of 10 km
9M120-1 Ataka – Upgraded Ataka missiles used by Ataka-T GWS.
9M127-1 Ataka-VM - New air to surface version for helicopters.

General specifications

Operators

Current operators

Algerian Air Force – used on Mi-24MKIII, Mi 171Sh2 and Mil Mi-28 helicopters.
Algerian Ground Forces – used on the BMPT Terminator.

Azerbaijani Air Forces – used on Mil Mi-35M helicopters.

Armed Forces of Belarus

Egyptian Air Force - used on Ka-52 and Mil Mi-24 helicopters.

Indian Air Force - used on Mil Mi-35 helicopters.

Indonesian Army – Used on Mi-35P attack helicopters.

Iranian Air Force – In 1999, 500 AT-6 Spiral missiles were ordered for the Mi-171Sh. The delivery started in 2000 and ended in 2003 with some of these missiles possibly being AT-9 Spiral-2s.

Armed Forces of the Republic of Kazakhstan – 120 missiles were ordered in 2010 for the BMPT tank support vehicle. In 2011, 40 were delivered.

Russian Armed Forces – Operated on a wide range of vehicles ranging from helicopters to ATGM carriers.

Slovenian Armed Forces – Six launchers were ordered in 2009 and mounted on patrol boat "Triglav" the following year.

Venezuelan Army Aviation used on Mil Mi-35M2 helicopters.

Possible operators

 Malian Air Force– used on Mil Mi-35 helicopters

Former operators
 – Passed on to successor states.
 
Brazilian Air Force – used on Mil Mi-35 helicopters.

See also
AGM-114 Hellfire
9K121 Vikhr

References

External links

Anti-tank guided missiles of Russia
Anti-tank guided missiles of the Soviet Union
KB Mashinostroyeniya products
Degtyarev Plant products
Modern thermobaric weapons of Russia
Military equipment introduced in the 1980s